The following is a list of notable deaths in November 2019.

Entries for each day are listed alphabetically by surname. A typical entry lists information in the following sequence:
 Name, age, country of citizenship at birth, subsequent country of citizenship (if applicable), reason for notability, cause of death (if known), and reference.

November 2019

1
Rudy Boesch, 91, American Navy SEAL, reality show contestant (Survivor: Borneo, Survivor: All-Stars) and host (Combat Missions), Alzheimer's disease.
Roger Cardinal, 79, British art historian. 
Peter Collier, 80, American writer.
Romuald D'Souza, 93, Indian Jesuit priest, founder of the Xavier Centre of Historical Research.
Gilles Fontaine, 71, Canadian astrophysicist.
Pierre Gabaye, 89, French composer.
Diana González, 26, Mexican footballer (América), hypoglycemia.
Chandra Kaluarachchi, 76, Sri Lankan actress (Seilama).
Ary Kara, 77, Brazilian politician, Deputy (1983–2007), cancer.
Bill Koman, 85, American football player (St. Louis Cardinals).
Rina Lazo, 96, Guatemalan-born Mexican painter, cardiac arrest.
Mark LeBlanc, 69, American sailor.
Daniel Mullins, 90, Irish-born Welsh Roman Catholic prelate, Bishop of Menevia (1987–2001).
Thuliswa Nkabinde-Khawe, 46, South African politician, member of the Gauteng Provincial Legislature (since 2009).
Miguel Olaortúa Laspra, 56, Spanish Roman Catholic prelate, Apostolic Vicar of Iquitos (since 2011).
Frank R. Palmer, 97, British linguist.
Tsvyatko Pashkulev, 74, Bulgarian Olympic wrestler (1964).
Renford Pinnock, 82, Jamaican cricketer.
Johannes Schaaf, 86, German film and stage director (Momo).
Archie Scott, 101, Scottish cricketer (national team).
Paul Turner, 73, Welsh film director (Hedd Wyn).
Hugh Waddell, 60, Scottish rugby league player.
Jerome L. Wilson, 88, American politician, member of the New York State Senate (1963–1966), pneumonia.
Vytautas Zabiela, 88, Lithuanian lawyer and politician, member of the Seimas (2003–2004).

2
Gene G. Abdallah, 83, American politician, member of the South Dakota Legislature (2001–2012).
Ian Cross, 93, New Zealand author (The God Boy) and journalist.
Dick Dearden, 81, American politician, member of the Iowa Senate (1995–2017).
Gustav Deutsch, 67, Austrian artist and filmmaker.
Norbert Eder, 63, German footballer (Bayern Munich, Zürich, national team).
Atilla Engin, 73, Turkish jazz drummer, stroke.
Sigvard Ericsson, 89, Swedish speed skater, Olympic champion (1956).
Irwin Fridovich, 90, American biochemist.
Susana Herrera, 56, Spanish alpine skier, Paralympic champion (1988), lung cancer.
Leo Iorga, 54, Romanian rock singer and guitarist, lung cancer.
Phillip E. Johnson, 79, American lawyer, co-founder of Intelligent design movement.
Marie Laforêt, 80, French-Swiss singer ("Mon amour, mon ami") and actress (Male Hunt, Who Wants to Kill Sara?).
Krishan Kumar Modi, 79, Indian business executive (Modi Enterprises).
Walter Mercado, 87, Puerto Rican astrologer, kidney failure.
Vaijnath Patil, 81, Indian politician, MLA (1994–1999, 2004–2008).
Dean Prentice, 87, Canadian ice hockey player (New York Rangers, Boston Bruins, Pittsburgh Penguins).
P. Purushothaman, 71, Indian politician, MLA (1985–1990, 2011–2016), cardiac arrest.
James I. Robertson Jr., 89, American historian.
Indrajit Tangi, 75, Indian politician, MLA (2006–2011).
Brian Tarantina, 60, American actor (The Marvelous Mrs. Maisel, City by the Sea, Gilmore Girls), accidental drug overdose.
Bramwell Tillsley, 88, Canadian Salvationist, General of The Salvation Army (1993–1994).
Bohumil Tomášek, 83, Czech Olympic basketball player (1960).

3
Gert Boyle, 95, German-born American business executive (Columbia Sportswear) and philanthropist.
William B. Branch, 92, American playwright, cancer.
Gerry Carr, 83, British Olympic athlete (1956).
Ion Dediu, 85, Moldovan biologist.
Michel Eddé, 91, Lebanese politician and businessman.
Louis Eppolito, 71, American police officer, mobster and author.
Sorin Frunzăverde, 59, Romanian politician, MP (2007–2009) and Minister of National Defence (2000, 2006–2007), kidney disease.
Hu Zhaoxi, 86, Chinese historian.
Gabriel Jackson, 98, American Hispanist.
Louis Lareng, 96, French physician and politician.
Friedemann Layer, 78, Austrian conductor.
Yvette Lundy, 103, French Resistance member and Legion of Honour recipient.
Harish Mahapatra, Indian politician, MLA (1971–1977).
Taku Mayumura, 85, Japanese science fiction novelist (Psychic School Wars), aspiration pneumonia.
Alberto Rivolta, 51, Italian footballer (Inter Milan, Livorno, Seregno), ependymoma.
Shoji Sadao, 92, Japanese-American architect.
Girônimo Zanandréa, 83, Brazilian Roman Catholic prelate, Coadjutor Bishop (1987–1994) and Bishop of Erexim (1994–2012).

4
Adam Babah-Alargi, 91, Ghanaian engineer.
Gay Byrne, 85, Irish broadcaster (The Late Late Show, The Gay Byrne Show, The Meaning of Life).
Jacques Dupont, 91, French racing cyclist, Olympic champion (1948).
Yılmaz Gökdel, 79, Turkish football player and manager.
Timi Hansen, 61, Danish bassist (Mercyful Fate, King Diamond), cancer.
Sadeque Hossain Khoka, 67, Bangladeshi politician, mayor of Dhaka City Corporation (2002–2011), cancer.
Jim LeClair, 69, American football player (Cincinnati Bengals, New Jersey Generals).
Virginia Leith, 94, American actress (Fear and Desire, The Brain That Wouldn't Die).
David Levinson, 80, American television producer and writer.
David M. Madden, 64, American politician, mayor of Weymouth, Massachusetts (2000–2008).
Johannes Michalski, 83, Belgian-born American painter.
Richard Nelson, 77, American anthropologist.
Eli Pasquale, 59, Canadian Olympic basketball player (1984, 1988), cancer.
Tun Lwin, 71, Burmese meteorologist.
Dmitri Vasilenko, 43, Russian gymnast, Olympic champion (1996), amyotrophic lateral sclerosis.

5
Omero Antonutti, 84, Italian actor (Pleasant Nights, Padre Padrone, El Dorado), cancer.
Sally Dixon, 87, American film curator, cancer.
Ed Dolejs, 90, American-born New Zealand Hall of Fame softball coach (national women's team).
Dominique Farran, 72, French radio presenter (RTL).
Ernest J. Gaines, 86, American author (A Lesson Before Dying, The Autobiography of Miss Jane Pittman, A Gathering of Old Men).
Laurel Griggs, 13, American actress (Once, Café Society), asthma attack.
Georges Gutelman, 80, Belgian airline executive (Trans European Airways) and evacuator (Operation Moses).
Kevin Hogan, 85, Australian footballer (South Melbourne) and radio broadcaster (ABC Local Radio).
Jan Erik Kongshaug, 75, Norwegian recording engineer and jazz guitarist.
Anatoliy Nogovitsyn, 67, Russian military officer, Deputy Chief of the General Staff of Armed Forces (2008–2012).
Larion Serghei, 67, Romanian sprint canoer, Olympic bronze medalist (1976).
Michael Sherwood, 60, American musician.
Ulf-Erik Slotte, 87, Finnish diplomat, Ambassador to Turkey (1973–1977), Australia (1988–1991) and Ireland (1991–1996).
Robert Smithies, 71, English-born Australian rugby league player (Hull Kingston Rovers, Balmain).
William Wintersole, 88, American actor (The Young and the Restless, General Hospital, Leadbelly), complications from cancer.
André Zimmermann, 80, French racing cyclist, Tour de l'Avenir winner (1963).

6
Tazeen Ahmad, 48, British journalist and broadcaster (NBC, BBC, Channel 4), cancer.
Kurt Amplatz, 95, Austrian-born American radiologist and inventor.
Lev Anninsky, 85, Russian literary critic, historian and screenwriter.
Nikki Araguz Loyd, 44, American LGBT rights activist, author and public speaker, accidental drug overdose.
Cheng Sihan, 58, Chinese actor (Journey to the West: Conquering the Demons, The Taking of Tiger Mountain), heart attack.
Dave Crossan, 79, American football player (Washington Redskins).
John Curro, 86, Australian violinist and conductor.
Stephen Dixon, 83, American author, complications from pneumonia and Parkinson's disease.
Michael Fray, 72, Jamaican Olympic sprinter (1968).
Bogaletch Gebre, 59, Ethiopian women's rights activist (KMG Ethiopia).
Michael Hanack, 88, German chemist.
Juliaan Lampens, 93, Belgian architect.
Richard Lindley, 83, British television journalist.
Daniel Lobb, 80, British optical instrument designer. 
Clive Minton, 85, Australian ornithologist.
Jan Stráský, 78, Czech politician, Prime Minister of Czechoslovakia (1992).
Mike Streicher, 62, American Hall of Fame racing driver.
Albert Tévoédjrè, 89, Beninese writer and politician.

7
Moin Uddin Khan Badal, 67, Bangladeshi politician, MP (since 2008).
Gilles Bertin, 58, French singer (Camera Silens) and criminal, AIDS.
Remo Bodei, 81, Italian philosopher.
Robert Freeman, 82, English photographer (With the Beatles, A Hard Day's Night, Rubber Soul) and graphic designer.
Heinz Höher, 81, German football player (Bayer Leverkusen, Bochum) and manager (PAOK).
Leo Klejn, 92, Russian archaeologist and philologist.
Ivan Maksimović, 57, Serbian rock guitarist (Metro, The No Smoking Orchestra).
Dan McGrew, 82, American football player (Buffalo Bills).
Fiorella Negro, 81, Italian Olympic figure skater (1956).
Maria Perego, 95, Italian animator, creator of Topo Gigio.
Jean Piqué, 84, French rugby union player.
Nik Powell, 69, British film producer and record executive, co-founder of Virgin Records, Director of the National Film and Television School (2003–2017).
Margarita Salas, 80, Spanish biochemist and academic.
Frank Saul, 95, American basketball player (Minneapolis Lakers, Baltimore Bullets, Rochester Royals).
Nabaneeta Dev Sen, 81, Indian novelist, cancer.
Janette Sherman, 89, American physician and toxicology researcher.
Haitham Ahmed Zaki, 35, Egyptian actor (Halim), circulatory collapse.

8
Wendell Bell, 95, American futurist. 
Fred Bongusto, 84, Italian singer, songwriter and film composer (Day After Tomorrow, The Divorce, Come Have Coffee with Us).
Amor Chadli, 94, Tunisian physician and politician, Minister of Education (1986–1987).
Namut Dai, 64–65, Indian academic.
Lucette Destouches, 107, French ballet dancer and instructor.
Werner Doehner, 90, German-born American, last living survivor of the Hindenburg disaster.
Ramakant Gundecha, 57, Indian classical singer, heart attack.
Annie Hall, 69, British businesswoman, High Sheriff of Derbyshire (2017–2018), drowned.
Terry Katzman, 64, American record producer, sound engineer, and archivist.
Anatoly Krutikov, 86, Russian football player (CSKA Moscow, Spartak Moscow) and manager (Spartak Nalchik).
Cyril McGuinness, 54, Irish criminal and smuggler, heart attack.
Jackie Moore, 73, American singer.
*Felipe Reynoso Jiménez, 100, Mexican politician, Municipal President of Aguascalientes (1975–1977).
Fróso Spentzári, 77, Greek pharmacist and politician, MP (1981–1985).
Thích Trí Quang, 95, Vietnamese Mahayana Buddhist monk and political activist.

9
George Breen, 84, American Hall of Fame swimmer, Olympic silver (1956) and bronze medalist (1956, 1960), pancreatic cancer.
Sandile Dikeni, 53, South African poet, tuberculosis.
Les Downes, 74, New Zealand cricketer (Central Districts).
Ore Falomo, 77, Nigerian physician.
John Gokongwei, 93, Filipino businessman and philanthropist, founder of JG Summit Holdings.
Noel Ignatiev, 78, American author and historian, intestinal infarction.
Zaid Kilani, 81, Jordanian gynecologist.
Kehinde Lijadu, 71, Nigerian singer (Lijadu Sisters), stroke.
Carlyle A. Luer, 97, American botanist.
Harold C. Lyon Jr., 84, American psychologist and educator. 
Rebecca Matlock, 91, American photographer.
Brian Mawhinney, Baron Mawhinney, 79, British politician, MP (1979–2005), Minister for Health (1992–1994).
Andrea Newman, 81, English author.
Cecil Pedlow, 85, Irish rugby union player (Lions, national team).
Dwight Ritchie, 27, Australian boxer.
Cyril Robinson, 90, English footballer (Blackpool, Bradford (Park Avenue), Southport).
Yusuf Scott, 42, American football player (Arizona Cardinals, Berlin Thunder).
Džemma Skulme, 94, Latvian artist and painter.
Bob Szajner, 81, American jazz pianist.
Mehmet Tillem, 45, Turkish-born Australian politician, senator (2013–2014), cardiac arrest.
Douglas Vaz, 83, Jamaican politician, MP (1976–1993).
Hans Verèl, 66, Dutch football player (Sparta Rotterdam) and manager (FC Den Bosch, NAC).

10
Jim Adams, 91, American lacrosse coach (Army Black Knights, Penn Quakers, Virginia Cavaliers).
Werner Andreas Albert, 84, German composer and conductor.
Annie Anzieu, 95, French psychoanalyst.
Jan Byrczek, 83, Polish-American jazz bassist, founder of Jazz Forum.
Les Campbell, 84, English footballer (Wigan Athletic, Preston North End, Blackpool).
Russell Chatham, 80, American painter.
Bob Fry, 88, American football player (Los Angeles Rams, Dallas Cowboys).
Luciano De Genova, 88, Italian Olympic weightlifter (1956, 1960).
Allan Gray, 81, South African investor and philanthropist, founder of Allan Gray Investment Management.
Jerry Hirshberg, 79, American automotive and industrial designer, musician and painter.
Erik Køppen, 96, Danish footballer (KB, national team).
Li Lianxiu, 95, Chinese military and police officer, Commander of the People's Armed Police (1984–1990).
Rick Ludwin, 71, American television executive (NBC).
Oliver Miles, 83, British diplomat, ambassador to Luxembourg (1985–1988) and Greece (1993–1996).
Lawrence G. Paull, 81, American film production designer (Blade Runner, Back to the Future, City Slickers).
T. N. Seshan, 86, Indian civil servant, Chief Election Commissioner (1990–1996) and Cabinet Secretary (1989), cardiac arrest.
Dennis Sorrell, 79, English footballer (Leyton Orient).
István Szívós, 71, Hungarian Hall of Fame water polo player, Olympic champion (1976).
Vanni Treves, 79, Italian-born British lawyer and business executive.
Bernard Tyson, 60, American executive, CEO (since 2013) and chairman (since 2014) of Kaiser Permanente.

11
Alaa Ali, 31, Egyptian footballer (Smouha, Zamalek), cancer.
Bad Azz, 43, American rapper.
Tauba Biterman, 102, Polish-born American Holocaust survivor.
Zeke Bratkowski, 88, American football player (Chicago Bears, Los Angeles Rams, Green Bay Packers).
Mary Christian, 95, American politician, member of the Virginia House of Delegates (1986–2003).
Ted Cullinan, 88, English architect (Charles Cryer Theatre, Fountains Abbey, Weald and Downland Gridshell).
Tam David-West, 83, Nigerian virologist, federal minister and academic.
Frank Dobson, 79, British politician, MP (1979–2015), Secretary of State for Health (1997–1999).
Stuart Fitzsimmons, 62, British Olympic alpine skier (1976), pneumonia.
Alan Hagman, 55, American photojournalist and editor (Los Angeles Times).
Jacky Imbert, 89, French criminal.
Lisa Kindred, 79, American folk musician, POEMS syndrome.
Winston Lackin, 64, Surinamese politician, Minister of Foreign Affairs (2010–2015).
James Le Mesurier, 48, British army officer and aid worker (White Helmets).
Tadashi Nakamura, 89, Japanese voice actor (Star of the Giants, Ironfist Chinmi, Like the Clouds, Like the Wind), complications from gallbladder inflammation.
Ralph T. O'Neal, 85, British Virgin Islands politician, Premier (1995–2003, 2007–2011).
Charles Rogers, 38, American football player (Detroit Lions), liver failure.
Mümtaz Soysal, 90, Turkish politician and lawyer, Minister of Foreign Affairs (1994) and Vice-Chairman of Amnesty International (1976–1978).
Helen Stern, 89, American sculptor, art collector and philanthropist, pneumonia.
Robin Lee Wilson, 86, British civil engineer, President of the Institution of Civil Engineers (1991–1992).
Minoru Yoneyama, 95, Japanese businessman, founder of Yonex.
Sir Edward Zacca, 88, Jamaican judge, Chief Justice (1985–1996) and acting Governor-General (1991).

12
Baha Abu al-Ata, 41, Palestinian Islamic militant, air strike.
Edwin Bramall, Baron Bramall, 95, British field marshal, Chief of the General Staff (1979–1982) and the Defence Staff (1982–1985).
Mel Brown, 84, Canadian Olympic basketball player (1956).
Ian Cullen, 80, British actor (Z-Cars, Family Affairs).
Benedict de Tscharner, 82, Swiss writer and diplomat, Ambassador to France (1997–2002).
Herb Dickenson, 88, Canadian ice hockey player (New York Rangers).
Dennis Hartley, 83, English rugby league footballer (Hunslet, Castleford Tigers).
Zoran Hristić, 81, Serbian composer.
Bob Johnson, 83, American baseball player (Washington Senators, Baltimore Orioles, Oakland Athletics).
Vasiliy Kurilov, 71, Belarusian football player (Dinamo Minsk, Kolos Poltava, Dynamo Brest) and manager.
Lu Youquan, 76, Chinese education scholar.
Luciano Marin, 87, Italian actor (A Man of Straw, Goliath and the Barbarians, The Commandant).
Raju Mathew, 82, Indian film producer (Kelkkaatha Sabdham, Anubandham, Thanmathra).
Jim McBurney, 86, Canadian ice hockey player (Chicago Blackhawks).
William J. McCoy, 77, American politician, member (1980–2012) and speaker (2004–2012) of the Mississippi House of Representatives.
Basile Adjou Moumouni, 97, Beninese physician.
Meg Myles, 84, American actress (Satan in High Heels).
Ann Peoples, 72, American politician, member of the Maine House of Representatives (2006–2014, since 2018).
Víctor Manuel Pérez Rojas, 79, Venezuelan Roman Catholic prelate, Bishop of San Fernando de Apure (2001–2016).
Ram Ray, 77, Indian advertising professional.
Rosemary Rogers, 86, British-American novelist.
Dois I. Rosser Jr., 98, American businessman and missionary.
Martin Sagner, 77, Croatian actor and politician, MP (1990–1995).
Mitsuhisa Taguchi, 64, Japanese footballer (Mitsubishi Motors, national team), respiratory failure.
Vincenzo Zazzaro, 68, Italian footballer (Milan, Arezzo, Salernitana).

13
Stephen Albert, 69, Australian indigenous actor and singer (Bran Nue Dae, Corrugation Road).
Sean Bonney, 50, English poet.
Guillermo Cosío Vidaurri, 90, Mexican diplomat and politician, Governor of Jalisco (1989–1992), Deputy (1976–1979, 1985–1988) and Secretary General of PRI (1981), dengue.
Giorgio Corbellini, 72, Italian Roman Catholic prelate, President of the Disciplinary Commission of the Roman Curia (since 2010).
Zulkarnain Karim, 69, Indonesian politician, member of the Regional Representative Council (2014–2019), and mayor of Pangkal Pinang (2003–2013).
Robert Lyon, 96, British army major general.
Arthur Marks, 92, American film and television director (Detroit 9000, Friday Foster, Perry Mason).
Kieran Modra, 47, Australian swimmer and cyclist, Paralympic champion (1996, 2004, 2008, 2012), traffic collision.
André Moes, Luxembourgian Olympic road cyclist (1952).
Andrew Palmer, 82, British diplomat, Ambassador to the Holy See (1991–1995).
Raymond Poulidor, 83, French racing cyclist, Vuelta a España winner (1964).
Tom Spurgeon, 50, American journalist, comics critic and editor (The Comics Journal), Eisner Award winner (2010, 2012, 2013).
Yukihiro Takiguchi, 34, Japanese actor (Musical: The Prince of Tennis, Kamen Rider Drive), heart failure.
Josephus Thimister, 57, Dutch fashion designer, suicide.
Niall Tóibín, 89, Irish comedian and actor (Ryan's Daughter, Far and Away, Veronica Guerin).
Fernando Torres Durán, 82, Colombian-born Panamanian Roman Catholic prelate, Bishop of Chitré (1999–2013).
Bill Trowbridge, 89, British physicist and engineer.
José Luis Veloso, 82, Spanish footballer (Deportivo de La Coruña, Real Madrid).
Zhang Qi, 96, Chinese physician and professor.

14
María Baxa, 73, Italian-Serbian actress (Black Turin, Deadly Chase, Candido Erotico).
Jean Fergusson, 74, English actress (Last of the Summer Wine, Coronation Street).
Gordie Gosse, 64, Canadian politician, member (2003–2015) and speaker (2011–2013) of the Nova Scotia House of Assembly, cancer.
Anthony Grundy, 40, American basketball player (Atlanta Hawks, Panellinios, AEK), stabbed.
Branko Lustig, 87, Croatian film producer (Schindler's List, Gladiator, The Peacemaker) and Holocaust survivor, Oscar winner (1994, 2001).
Charles Moir, 88, American college basketball coach (Roanoke, Tulane, Virginia Tech), heart failure.
Uwe Rathjen, 76, German Olympic handball player (1972).
Orville Rogers, 101, American pilot and marathon runner.
Zwelonke Sigcawu, 51, South African royal, King of the Xhosa people (since 2006).
Vashishtha Narayan Singh, 77, Indian mathematician.
Alex Winitsky, 94, American film producer (The Seven-Per-Cent Solution, Cuba, Irreconcilable Differences).

15
Alex Akinyele, 81, Nigerian politician and sports administrator.
Olav Bjørgaas, 93, Norwegian physician (Norwegian Mission Alliance).
Mark Cady, 66, American judge, Chief Justice of the Iowa Supreme Court (since 2011), heart attack.
Jim Coates, 87, American baseball player (New York Yankees, California Angels).
Harrison Dillard, 96, American sprinter and hurdler, Olympic champion (1948, 1952), stomach cancer.
John Exelby, 78, British television executive.
Susan Fargo, 77, American politician, member of the Massachusetts Senate (1997–2012).
Fu Zhengyi, 93–94, Chinese film editor, winner of the Golden Rooster Award for Lifetime Achievement (2011).
Jeanne Guillemin, 76, American medical anthropologist.
John S. Hilliard, 72, American composer.
Vladimir Hotineanu, 69, Moldovan surgeon and politician, Minister of Health, Labour and Social Protection (2009–2010), MP (2010–2019).
Vojtěch Jasný, 93, Czech film director (September Nights, All My Compatriots, The Great Land of Small).
Tony Mann, 74, Australian cricketer (national team), pancreatic cancer.
Marcel Mart, 92, Luxembourgish politician, Minister for the Economy, Energy and Transport (1969–1977) and president of European Court of Auditors (1984–1989).
Sallie McFague, 86, American Christian feminist theologian.
Irv Noren, 94, American baseball player (Washington Senators, New York Yankees) and coach (Oakland Athletics).
Krystyna Nowakowska, 83, Polish Olympic athlete (1960).
Juliusz Paetz, 84, Polish Roman Catholic prelate, Bishop of Łomża (1982–1996) and Archbishop of Poznań (1996–2002).
Ray Preston, 90, Australian rugby league player (Newtown Jets).
Papa Don Schroeder, 78, American radio station owner (WPNN) and record producer, throat cancer.
Jorge Vergara, 64, Mexican businessman and film producer (The Assassination of Richard Nixon), owner of Chivas Guadalajara (since 2002) and founder of Grupo Omnilife, heart attack.
Johan Wahjudi, 66, Indonesian badminton player, world champion (1977).

16
John Campbell Brown, 72, Scottish astronomer, Astronomer Royal for Scotland (since 1995).
Gilbert Brunat, 61, French rugby union player (Lourdes, Grenoble, national team).
Nancy Brunning, 48, New Zealand actress (What Becomes of the Broken Hearted?), cancer.
Browning Bryant, 62, American singer-songwriter.
Fernand Carton, 98, French linguist.
Mireille Cayre, 72, French Olympic gymnast (1968, 1972).
Vera Clemente, 78, Puerto Rican philanthropist.
Irma Cordero, 77, Peruvian Olympic volleyball player (1968, 1976).
Bronisław Dembowski, 92, Polish Roman Catholic prelate, Bishop of Włocławek (1992–2003).
Diane Loeffler, 66, American politician, member of the Minnesota House of Representatives (since 2005), cancer.
Satnarayan Maharaj, 88, Trinidadian Hindu religious leader, assistant secretary (1972–1977) and secretary general (since 1977) of the Sanatan Dharma Maha Sabha, stroke.
Robert Malouf, 88, Canadian Olympic boxer (1952).
Éric Morena, 68, French singer.
Fabrizio Nassi, 68, Italian Olympic volleyball player (1976, 1980).
Bogdan Niculescu-Duvăz, 69, Romanian politician, MP (1990–2016). 
Terry O'Neill, 81, British photographer, prostate cancer.
Mary Previte, 87, American politician, member of the New Jersey General Assembly (1998–2006).
Manabendranath Saha, 57, Indian politician, MLA (2006–2011), suicide by hanging.
Joel Skornicka, 82, American politician, Mayor of Madison, Wisconsin (1979–1983), blood clot.
Johnny Wheeler, 91, English footballer (Bolton Wanderers, Liverpool, national team).
Zeng Guoyuan, 66, Singaporean businessman and politician, fall.

17
Nicholas Amer, 96, English actor (Henry VIII and His Six Wives, The Draughtsman's Contract, A Man for All Seasons).
Jale Birsel, 92, Turkish actress.
Jiřina Čermáková, 75, Czech field hockey player, Olympic silver medallist (1980).
Ed Chalupka, 72, Canadian football player (Hamilton Tiger-Cats) and administrator, President of the CFLPA (1981–1986).
Arsenio Corsellas, 86, Spanish actor.
Ben Humphreys, 85, Australian politician, MHR (1977–1996) and Minister for Veterans' Affairs (1987–1993).
Yıldız Kenter, 91, Turkish actress (Hanım, The Raindrop, Big Man, Little Love), lung disease.
Jacek Kurzawiński, 57, Polish volleyball coach (national team).
Dorothy Seymour Mills, 91, American baseball historian, complications from an ulcer.
Kisinoti Mukwazhe, 49, Zimbabwean politician.
Harley D. Nygren, 94, American rear admiral, director of the NOAA Corps (1970–1981).
Adnan Pachachi, 96, Iraqi politician and diplomat, Minister of Foreign Affairs (1965–1967) and Acting Prime Minister (2004).
Václav Pavkovič, 83, Czech rower, Olympic bronze medalist (1960).
Gustav Peichl, 91, Austrian architect (ORF regional studios, Kunst- und Ausstellungshalle der Bundesrepublik Deutschland).
Maximilian Raub, 93, Austrian sprint canoer, World champion (1954) and Olympic bronze medallist (1952, 1956).
Tuka Rocha, 36, Brazilian race car driver, plane crash.
Sir Keith Sykes, 94, British anaesthetist.
Debbie Thompson, 77, American Olympic sprinter (1964).
Regina Tyshkevich, 90, Belarusian mathematician.
John Wegner, 69, German-born Australian operatic baritone, Parkinson's disease.

18
Bridget Adams, 91, British Olympic figure skater (1948).
Norodom Buppha Devi, 76, Cambodian royal and prima ballerina, Minister of Culture and Fine Arts (1998–2004).
Ryan Costello, 23, American baseball player (Pensacola Blue Wahoos).
Sandrine Daudet, 47, French Olympic short track speed skater (1992, 1994).
John Gale, 65, English poker player.
Gary Haberl, 54, Australian Olympic table-tennis player (1988).
Laure Killing, 60, French actress (Beyond Therapy, Love After Love, The Teddy Bear) and comedian.
Midori Kiuchi, 69, Japanese actress (Princess Comet, Tokugawa Ieyasu, Takekurabe), heart attack.
Ching-Liang Lin, 88, Taiwanese physicist.
Srboljub Markušević, 83, Yugoslav football player and manager (FK Sarajevo).
Brad McQuaid, 50, American video game designer (EverQuest, Vanguard: Saga of Heroes).
Sultan bin Zayed bin Sultan Al Nahyan, 62, Emirati royal, Deputy Prime Minister (1997–2009).
Seshagiri Rao, 86, Indian politician, MLA (1994–1999).
Argentina Santos, 95, Portuguese singer.
Doug Smart, 82, American basketball player (Washington Huskies).
Hyrum W. Smith, 76, American executive (FranklinCovey).

19
John Abel, 80, Australian politician, member of the Australian House of Representatives (1975–1977).
Ernesto Báez, 64, Colombian paramilitary leader (United Self-Defense Forces of Colombia), heart attack.
José Mário Branco, 77, Portuguese singer-songwriter, actor and record producer.
Purita Campos, 82, Spanish cartoonist, illustrator and painter.
Basil Feldman, Baron Feldman, 96, British politician and businessman.
Bob Hallberg, 75, American college basketball coach (St. Xavier University, Chicago State University, University of Illinois at Chicago).
D. M. Jayaratne, 88, Sri Lankan politician, Prime Minister (2010–2015) and MP (1989–2015).
Tom Lyle, 66, American comics artist (Starman, Comet, Peter Parker: Spider-Man).
Qian Jiaqi, 80, Chinese nephrologist.
Fazlollah Reza, 104, Iranian professor, scientist and scholar, ambassador to UNESCO (1969–1974) and Canada (1974–1978).
Martinus Dogma Situmorang, 73, Indonesian Roman Catholic prelate, Bishop of Padang (since 1983).
Colin Skipp, 80, British actor (The Archers).
Rémy Stricker, 83, French pianist and musicologist.
Lech Szczucki, 86, Polish historian.
Colin Tatz, 85, South African-born Australian historian.
Lloyd Watson, 70, English rock guitarist.
Jusup Wilkosz, 71, German bodybuilder.
Wee Willie Walker, 77, American soul and blues singer.
Manoucher Yektai, 97, Iranian-American artist (New York School).

20
Fábio Barreto, 62, Brazilian film director (Lula, Son of Brazil, O Quatrilho), complications from traffic collision.
Tony Brooker, 94, British computer scientist. 
Charles Brumskine, 68, Liberian politician, President pro tempore of the Senate (1997–1999).
Jake Burton Carpenter, 65, American snowboarder, founder of Burton Snowboards, cancer.
Jordan Cekov, 98, Macedonian partisan and journalist.
Fred Cox, 80, American football player (Minnesota Vikings), co-inventor of Nerf football.
Bertha Díaz, 83, Cuban Olympic athlete (1956, 1960).
Zoltán Dömötör, 84, Hungarian water polo player, Olympic champion (1964).
Du Ruiqing, 75, Chinese translator and educator, President of Xi'an Foreign Languages Institute (1998–2005).
Almaas Elman, Somali-born Canadian peace and human rights activist, shot.
Mary L. Good, 88, American inorganic chemist, acting Secretary of Commerce (1996).
Mari-Luci Jaramillo, 91, American diplomat, ambassador to Honduras (1977–1980).
Andrew Jin Daoyuan, 90, Chinese Patriotic Catholic Association prelate, Bishop of Lu’an (since 2000).
Meddie Kaggwa, 64, Ugandan lawyer and politician, Chairman of the Uganda Human Rights Commission (since 2009).
Peter Kattuk, 69, Canadian politician, MLA (1999–2008).
Amos Lapidot, 85, Israeli fighter pilot, Commander of the Israeli Air Force (1982–1987), and president of Technion.
Doug Lubahn, 71, American rock bassist (Clear Light, The Doors, Billy Squier).
Elmer Maddux, 85, American politician, member of the Oklahoma House of Representatives (1988–2004).
John Mann, 57, Canadian guitarist and singer (Spirit of the West), and actor (Underworld: Evolution).
John Martin, 80, American racing driver.
Wataru Misaka, 95, American basketball player (New York Knicks).
Linda Orange, 69, American politician, member of the Connecticut House of Representatives (since 1997), pancreatic cancer.
Michael J. Pollard, 80, American actor (Bonnie and Clyde, Scrooged, House of 1000 Corpses), cardiac arrest.
Qiu Shusen, 82, Chinese historian, specialist in the history of the Yuan dynasty and the Hui people.
Darren Servatius, 54, Canadian ice hockey player (Johnstown Chiefs), complications from diabetes.
Alastair Smith, 70, New Zealand library and information science academic (Victoria University of Wellington).
Alfred E. Smith IV, 68, American securities and healthcare executive (Bear Stearns, St. Vincent's Catholic Medical Center) and philanthropist (Al Smith Dinner).
Marilyn Yalom, 87, American feminist author and historian, multiple myeloma.
Dorel Zugrăvescu, 88, Romanian geophysicist.

21
Karl Bierschel, 87, German Olympic ice hockey player (1952, 1956).
Yaşar Büyükanıt, 79, Turkish general, Chief of Staff (2006–2008).
Donna Carson, 73, American folk singer (Hedge and Donna).
Wally Clark, 92, New Zealand zoologist (University of Canterbury).
Cui Yi, 89, Chinese lieutenant general, Deputy Political Commissar of COSTIND.
Bahtiar Effendy, 60, Indonesian Islamic scholar and activist.
Sir Donald Gordon, 89, South African property developer, founder of Liberty International.
Bengt-Erik Grahn, 78, Swedish Olympic alpine skier (1964, 1968).
James Griffin, 86, American philosopher.
Val Heim, 99, American baseball player (Chicago White Sox).
Ray Kappe, 92, American architect, founder of Southern California Institute of Architecture.
John Kastner, 73, Canadian documentary film director (Life with Murder, NCR: Not Criminally Responsible, Out of Mind, Out of Sight) and screenwriter.
Andrée Lachapelle, 88, Canadian actress (Léolo, Cap Tourmente, Route 132), assisted suicide.
Barbara Mandel, 93, American activist (National Council of Jewish Women) and philanthropist (Cooper-Hewitt, Smithsonian Design Museum).
Albertina Martínez Burgos, 38, Chilean photojournalist.
Anton Mavretič, 84, Slovene electrical engineer.
Oppe Quiñonez, 86, Paraguayan footballer (Nacional Asunción, national team).
Nigel Richards, 74, British major general, cancer.
William Seale, 79–80, American historian and author.
George Springate, 81, Canadian football player (Montreal Alouettes) and politician, MNA (1970–1981).
Gahan Wilson, 89, American cartoonist (Everybody's Favorite Duck, A Night in the Lonesome October, Spooky Stories for a Dark and Stormy Night).

22
Michael Breaugh, 77, Canadian politician, MP (1990–1993).
Tony Bull, 89, Australian football player (Melbourne).
Eugène Camara, 77, Guinean politician, Prime Minister (2007).
Sir Stephen Cleobury, 70, English organist, director of the Choir of King's College, Cambridge (1982–2019).
Jean Douchet, 90, French film critic, actor and director.
Eddie Duran, 94, American jazz guitarist.
Gaston Durnez, 91, Belgian author and journalist.
Martin Geck, 83, German musicologist.
Jasper Griffin, 82, British classical scholar, pneumonia.
Sean Haslegrave, 68, English footballer (Preston North End, Crewe Alexandra, York City).
He Jing, 84, Chinese hydraulic engineer and politician, Chief Engineer and Vice Minister of the Ministry of Water Resources.
Shaukat Kaifi, 91, Indian actress (Naina, Umrao Jaan, Salaam Bombay!).
Andreas Karlsböck, 59, Austrian politician, member of the National Council (2008–2017).
Daniel Leclercq, 70, French football player and manager (RC Lens, Olympique de Marseille), pulmonary embolism.
Gugu Liberato, 60, Brazilian television presenter, fall.
Make A Stand, 28, British racehorse, 1997 Champion Hurdle winner.
Chris Moncrieff, 88, British journalist, political editor of the Press Association (1980–1994).
Joaquim Moutinho, 67, Portuguese rally driver, Rally de Portugal winner (1986).
Eduardo Nascimento, 76, Angolan singer ("O vento mudou").
Kaare R. Norum, 86, Norwegian academic, rector of the University of Oslo.
David O'Morchoe, 89, British major general.
Vicky Randall, 74, English political scientist.
Antti Rantakangas, 55, Finnish politician, MP (since 1999).
Gurram Yadagiri Reddy, 91, Indian politician, MLA (1985–1999).
Cecilia Seghizzi, 111, Italian composer and painter.
Henry Sobel, 75, Portuguese-born Brazilian-American reform rabbi, cancer.
Bowen Stassforth, 93, American swimmer, Olympic silver medalist (1952).
Bill Waterhouse, 97, Australian bookmaker.
Warren Wolf, 92, American high school football coach and politician, member of the New Jersey General Assembly (1981–1983).

23
Bai Dezhang, 88, Chinese film actor (Visitors on the Icy Mountain) and director.
Asunción Balaguer, 94, Spanish actress (El canto del gallo, The Witching Hour, The Bird of Happiness), stroke.
Josep Maria Beal, 77, Andorran politician, General Syndic (1990–1991) and Mayor of Escaldes-Engordany (1984–1989).
Terry Board, 74, Australian footballer (Carlton).
Will Brunson, 49, American baseball player (Los Angeles Dodgers, Detroit Tigers), heart attack.
Leo Chamberlain, 79, English Roman Catholic priest and headmaster (Ampleforth College).
Bikash Chowdhury, 81, Indian cricketer.
Olly Croft, 90, British darts administrator, founder of the British Darts Organisation.
Marilyn Farquhar, 91, American cellular biologist.
Francesc Gambús, 45, Spanish politician, MEP (2014–2019).
Barbara Hillary, 88, American adventurer, first black woman to reach both poles.
Enrique Iturriaga, 101, Peruvian composer.
Ants Leemets, 69, Estonian politician and museum curator, Deputy Mayor of Tallinn (1996–2001) and Minister without portfolio (1995).
Catherine Small Long, 95, American politician, member of the U.S. House of Representatives (1985–1987), dementia.
Banshilal Mahto, 79, Indian politician, MP (2014–2019), liver disease.
Texe Marrs, 75, American conspiracy theorist, radio host and fundamentalist Christian minister.
Harry Morton, 38, American restaurateur, founder of Pink Taco.
Shirley Gordon Olafsson, 92, Canadian Olympic athlete (1948).
Liu Shahe, 88, Chinese writer and poet, complications from throat cancer.
Patrice Tirolien, 73, French politician, MP (1995–1997) and MEP (2009–2014).

24
Jean-Paul Benzécri, 87, French statistician.
Hank Bullough, 85, American football player (Green Bay Packers) and coach (New England Patriots, Buffalo Bills).
Robert Godshall, 86, American politician, member of the Pennsylvania House of Representatives (1983–2019).
Goo Hara, 28, South Korean singer (Kara) and actress (City Hunter), suicide.
Kshiti Goswami, 76, Indian politician, MLA (1991–2001, 2006–2011).
J. Bruce Jacobs, 76, American-born Australian orientalist, cancer.
Clive James, 80, Australian author (Cultural Amnesia), broadcaster (Clive James's Postcard from..., Fame in the 20th Century) and critic, leukaemia.
Kailash Chandra Joshi, 90, Indian politician, MP (2000–2014) and Chief Minister of Madhya Pradesh (1977–1978).
Mobarak Hossain Khan, 81, Bangladeshi musicologist, musician, and writer.
Nelson P. W. Khonje, 95, Malawian politician, Speaker of the National Assembly (1975–1987).
Lee Kim Sai, 82, Malaysian politician, MP (1986–1995) and Labour Minister (1986–1989).
Werner Kutzelnigg, 86, Austrian chemist.
Colin Mawby, 83, English organist, composer and conductor.
Takashi Miyahara, 85, Japanese-Nepalese tour operator and politician, founder of Nepal Rastriya Bikas Party.
Dion Neutra, 93, American architect (Neutra VDL Studio and Residences) and preservationist.
Juan Orrego-Salas, 100, Chilean-born American composer.
Nimish Pilankar, 29, Indian sound editor (Race 3, Kesari, Housefull 4), brain haemorrhage.
Yehoshua Porath, 81, Israeli historian.
Robert F. X. Sillerman, 71, American broadcasting and live event executive (SFX Entertainment).
Anil Raj, 35, American UNDP human rights activist and Amnesty International board member.
John Simon, 94, Serbian-born American theater and film critic (New York).
Joan Staley, 79, American model and actress (The Untouchables, 77 Sunset Strip, The Ghost and Mr. Chicken), heart failure.
Narayan Rao Tarale, 83, Indian politician, MLA (1994–1999).
Lyudmila Verbitskaya, 83, Russian linguist, Rector (1994–2008) and President (since 2008) of Saint Petersburg State University.
Ed Weisacosky, 75, American football player (Miami Dolphins, New York Giants, New England Patriots).
Frank E. Young, 88, American physician, Commissioner of Food and Drugs (1984–1989).

25
Frank Biondi, 74, American film and television executive, CEO of HBO (1983), Viacom (1987–1996) and Universal Studios (1996–1998), bladder cancer.
André Bisson, 90, Canadian academic and executive.
Chang Jen-hu, 92, Taiwanese geographer.
George Clements, 87, American Roman Catholic priest and civil rights activist, heart attack.
Héctor García-Molina, 66, Mexican-born American computer scientist.
Martin Harvey, 78, Northern Irish footballer (Sunderland, national team).
János Horváth, 98, Hungarian politician, MP (1945–1947, 1998–2014).
Bevin Hough, 90, New Zealand rugby league player (Auckland, national team) and long jumper, British Empire Games silver medalist (1950).
Larry Hurtado, 75, American New Testament scholar.
Charlot Jeudy, 34, Haitian LGBT activist.
Nobuaki Kobayashi, 77, Japanese three-cushion billiards player, two-time world champion.
Carolyn Konheim, 81, American environmental activist.
Franz Lichtblau, 91, German architect.
Muiris Mac Conghail, 78, Irish journalist.
Bill McCreary Sr., 84, Canadian ice hockey player (St. Louis Blues, Montreal Canadiens, New York Rangers).
Pete Musser, 92, American investor and philanthropist, cardiac arrest.
Alain Porthault, 90, French Olympic sprinter (1948, 1952) and rugby player (national team, Racing 92).
Jay Powell, 67, American politician, member of the Georgia House of Representatives (since 2008).
Garth C. Reeves Sr., 100, Bahamian-born American newspaper publisher (The Miami Times).
Jimmy Schulz, 51, German politician, member of the Bundestag (2009–2013, since 2017).
Iain Sutherland, 71, Scottish musician (The Sutherland Brothers) and songwriter ("(I Don't Want to Love You But) You Got Me Anyway", "Arms of Mary").
Tsebin Tchen, 78, Chinese-born Australian politician, Senator (1999–2005), traffic collision.
Goar Vartanian, 93, Soviet-Armenian spy, uncovered Operation Long Jump.
Michael Wright, British academic.

26
Jack Ady, 86, Canadian politician.
Gulzar Ahmed, Bangladeshi politician, MP (1996).
Cyrus Chothia, 77, English biochemist.
Vittorio Congia, 89, Italian actor (5 marines per 100 ragazze, Shivers in Summer, Obiettivo ragazze).
Howard Cruse, 75, American cartoonist and comic book writer (Stuck Rubber Baby), cancer.
Sudhir Dar, 87, Indian cartoonist.
Thakur Prithvi Singh Deora, 85, Indian politician, MLA (1967–1972).
Yeshi Dhonden, 92, Tibetan physician and humanitarian, founder of the Men-Tsee-Khang, respiratory failure.
James L. Holloway III, 97, American admiral, Chief of Naval Operations (1974–1978).
Rabiul Hussain, 76, Bangladeshi architect and writer.
Ken Kavanagh, 95, Australian motorcycle racer.
Köbi Kuhn, 76, Swiss football player (Zürich, national team) and manager.
Juan Lombardo, 92, Argentine vice admiral.
William E. Macaulay, 74, American investment executive, chairman of First Reserve Corporation, and financer of the William E. Macaulay Honors College, heart attack.
Bruno Nicolè, 79, Italian footballer (Juventus, Roma, national team).
Phil Nugent, 80, American football player.
Barry O'Donnell, 93, Irish pediatric surgeon.
Gerald Regan, 91, Canadian politician, MP (1963–1965, 1980–1984) and Premier of Nova Scotia (1970–1978).
Dan Reisinger, 85, Israeli graphic designer and artist. 
Gary Rhodes, 59, English chef (Rhodes W1) and television personality (MasterChef, Local Food Hero), subdural haematoma.
Osvaldo Romberg, 81, Argentine artist.
Karel Werner, 94, Czech-born British philosopher and religious scholar.
Yin Xiaowei, 46, Chinese materials scientist.

27
Martin Armiger, 70, Australian musician (The Sports) and composer (Young Einstein, Cody), genetic lung condition.
Ciputra, 88, Indonesian property developer and philanthropist.
Stefan Danailov, 76, Bulgarian actor (Ladies' Choice, Affection, Something Out of Nothing) and politician, Minister of Culture (2005–2009), lymphoma.
Terry de Havilland, 81, British shoe designer.
Clay Evans, 94, American pastor and civil rights advocate.
Maarit Feldt-Ranta, 51, Finnish politician, MP (2007–2019), stomach cancer.
Svatoslav Galík, 81, Czech competitive orienteer.
Godfrey Gao, 35, Taiwanese-Canadian model and actor (The Mortal Instruments: City of Bones, Love is a Broadway Hit, Legend of the Ancient Sword), cardiac arrest.
Brad Gobright, 31, American rock climber, climbing fall.
Hà Văn Tấn, 82, Vietnamese historian.
Jaegwon Kim, 85, South Korean-American philosopher.
Sushil Kumar, 79, Indian admiral, Chief of the Naval Staff (1998–2001).
Elio Locatelli, 76, Italian Olympic speed skater (1964, 1968).
Kutub Ahmed Mazumder, 80, Indian politician, MLA (2006–2011).
Sir Jonathan Miller, 85, English humourist (Beyond the Fringe), television presenter, and theatre director, Alzheimer's disease.
Bridglal Pachai, 91, South African-born Canadian educator and historian.
Agnes Baker Pilgrim, 95, American Takelma elder and activist, brain aneurysm.
John B. Robbins, 86, American medical researcher.
William Ruckelshaus, 87, American attorney, Deputy Attorney General (1973), Acting Director of FBI (1973) and Administrator of EPA (1970–1973, 1983–1985).
Ghazi Sial, 86, Pakistani poet.
Bala Singh, 67, Indian actor (Avatharam, Kaama, Pudhupettai), food poisoning.
John Henry Waddell, 98, American sculptor and painter.
Sam Watson, 67, Australian indigenous activist and writer.

28
Ernest Cabo, 86, French Roman Catholic prelate, Bishop of Basse-Terre (1984–2008).
Ratna Ram Chaudhary, 90, Indian politician, MLA (1977–1985, 1990–1993, 1998–2003).
Cilinho, 80, Brazilian football manager (São Paulo FC, Corinthians, Ponte Preta).
Andrew Clements, 70, American children's author (Frindle, A Week in the Woods, Things Not Seen).
Graham Crouch, 71, Australian Olympic middle-distance runner (1976).
Padú del Caribe, 99, Aruban musician and songwriter ("Aruba Dushi Tera").
Christopher Finzi, 85, British orchestral conductor. 
Grethe G. Fossum, 74, Norwegian politician, MP (1997–2001).
Bjarke Gundlev, 88, Danish footballer (AGF, national team).
Dorcas Hardy, 73, American administrator, Commissioner of the Social Security Administration (1986–1989).
Drago Kovačević, 66, Croatian Serb politician and writer, Mayor of Knin (1994–1995).
Pamela Lincoln, 82, American actress (Love of Life, The Doctors).
Marion McClinton, 65, American theatre director (Jitney, King Hedley II) and playwright, kidney failure.
John McKissick, 93, American Hall of Fame football coach (Summerville High School).
Jorge Hernán Monge, 81, Costa Rican footballer (Saprissa, national team).
Jan Nygren, 85, Swedish actor (Världens bästa Karlsson, The Brothers Lionheart, Den ofrivillige golfaren).
Juan Carlos Scannone, 88, Italian-Argentine Roman Catholic Jesuit priest.
Kermit Staggers, 72, American politician, member of the South Dakota Senate (1995–2002).
John Strohmayer, 73, American baseball player (Montreal Expos, New York Mets).
Endel Taniloo, 96, Estonian sculptor.
Tiny Ron Taylor, 72, American actor (The Rocketeer, Ace Ventura: Pet Detective) and basketball player (New York Nets).
Pim Verbeek, 63, Dutch football manager (South Korea, Australia, Oman), cancer.

29
Ruth Anderson, 91, American composer, lung cancer.
Irving Burgie, 95, American Hall of Fame songwriter ("Day-O (The Banana Boat Song)", "Jamaica Farewell", "In Plenty and In Time of Need").
Makio Inoue, 80, Japanese voice actor (Astro Boy, Captain Harlock, Lupin the Third).
Joseph Anthony Irudayaraj, 84, Indian Roman Catholic prelate, Bishop of the Dharmapuri (1997–2012).
Tony Karalius, 76, English rugby league player (St Helens, Wigan, Great Britain national team).
Usman Khan, 28, British terrorist, perpetrator of the 2019 London Bridge stabbing, shot.
Serge Lindier, 67, French comic book artist.
Roman Malek, 68, Polish-born German professor and sinologist.
Fitzhugh Mullan, 77, American physician, medical writer and professor at George Washington University.
Yasuhiro Nakasone, 101, Japanese politician, Prime Minister (1982–1987) and MP (1947–2004).
Julio Nazareno, 83, Argentinian jurist, President of the Supreme Court (1993–1994, 1994–2003), pulmonary disease.
Seymour Siwoff, 99, American sports statistician, owner of the Elias Sports Bureau (1952–2018).
R-Kal Truluck, 45, American football player (Saskatchewan Roughriders, Kansas City Chiefs), amyotrophic lateral sclerosis.
Phil Wyman, 74, American politician, member of the California State Assembly (1978–1992, 2000–2002) and Senate (1993–1995).

30
Ralph Anderson, 92, American politician, member of the South Carolina Senate (1997–2013) and House of Representatives (1991–1997).
Elizabeth Arrieta, 57, Uruguayan engineer and politician, Deputy (since 2015), traffic collision.
Cai Shaoqing, 86, Chinese historian, authority on Chinese secret societies.
Doug Cox, 62, Australian football player (St Kilda Football Club).
A. Hunter Dupree, 98, American historian.
Bertil Fiskesjö, 91, Swedish politician, MP (1971–1994).
Graziano Gasparini, 95, Venezuelan architect. 
Odette Grzegrzulka, 72, French politician.
Concha Hidalgo, 95, Spanish actress (Goya's Ghosts, Matador, Aída, La que se avecina)
Sir Michael Howard, 97, English historian, co-founder of the International Institute for Strategic Studies.
Petr Málek, 58, Czech sport shooter, Olympic silver medallist (2000).
Doris Merrick, 100, American actress (Girl Trouble, That Other Woman, The Big Noise) and model, heart failure.
Laxminarayan Nayak, 101, Indian politician, MLA (1957–1962, 1972–1977), MP (1977–1980).
Tejumola Olaniyan, 60, Nigerian academic, heart failure.
Ou Tangliang, 105, Chinese journalist, politician and diplomat.
Daniel Poliziani, 84, Canadian ice hockey player (Boston Bruins).
Harold Rahm, 100, American-Brazilian Roman Catholic priest.
Raeanne Rubenstein, 74, American photographer.
Milagrosa Tan, 61, Filipino politician, Governor of Samar (2001–2010, since 2019), cardiac arrest.
Brian Tierney, 97, British historian and medievalist.

References

2019-11
 11